Darren Lockhart (born 12 November 1973) is a football manager and former footballer from Northern Ireland who is currently the manager of NIFL Premier Intermediate League side Dundela.

Playing career
Born in Belfast, Lockhart began his professional career with Crusaders after playing at semi-professional level with H&W Welders and Carrick Rangers. After three years with Crusaders, he later played with Glentoran, where he spent seven years and won numerous trophies, before returning to Crusaders in 2007. Lockhart retired from professional football in April 2008, but was later persuaded to return to the game by Bangor. He signed for Ballymena United in 2009 and left join Championship 1 side Ards for the start of the 2010–11 season where he spent one year.

Managerial career
Lockhart joined Northern Amateur Football League side Sirocco Works in the summer of 2011 initially as a coach. He took over as manager in 2012, and left this position in October 2014.

In April 2015 Lockhart was appointed as manager of Dundela.

References

External links
Profile at PlayerHistory.com 
Profile at WalkTheChalk.com

1973 births
Living people
Association footballers from Northern Ireland
Association footballers from Belfast
NIFL Premiership players
Ards F.C. players
Ballymena United F.C. players
Bangor F.C. players
Carrick Rangers F.C. players
Crusaders F.C. players
Glentoran F.C. players
Association football midfielders
Harland & Wolff Welders F.C. players